Frida Abrahamsson (born 14 September 1994) is a Swedish football defender currently playing for KIF Orebro in the Damallsvenskan.

References

External links
  
  (archive)
 

1994 births
Living people
Swedish women's footballers
Damallsvenskan players
Piteå IF (women) players
Women's association football defenders
Sunnanå SK players
KIF Örebro DFF players